Crystal Planet is the seventh studio album by the guitarist Joe Satriani, released on March 3, 1998, by Epic Records. It was his first album to be released on Epic, whereas his previous six albums were released by Relativity Records. Crystal Planet reached No. 50 on the U.S. Billboard 200 and remained on that chart for eight weeks, as well as reaching the top 100 in five other countries. "Ceremony" was released as a single, reaching No. 28 on Billboard'''s Mainstream Rock chart and featuring Satriani's first recorded use of a seven-string guitar, namely the Ibanez Universe. "A Train of Angels" was nominated for Best Rock Instrumental Performance at the 1999 Grammy Awards, Satriani's ninth such nomination.

ReissuesCrystal Planet has been reissued twice. The first was on June 16, 2008, as part of the Original Album Classics box set, and most recently as part of The Complete Studio Recordings, released on April 22, 2014, by Legacy Recordings; this is a box set compilation containing remastered editions of every Satriani studio album from 1986 to 2013.

Critical reception

Stephen Thomas Erlewine at AllMusic awarded Crystal Planet four stars out five, calling it "an instrumental record with a difference" and Satriani's "finest all-instrumental effort since Surfing With the Alien''". He praised Satriani for "taking more chances than ever" and further developing his technique, saying that it reaches "new, uncharted waters".

Track listing

Personnel

Joe Satriani – guitar, guitar synthesizer, keyboard (tracks 5, 7, 13, 14), bass (tracks 2, 13, 14), harmonica, clapping (track 7), mixing (tracks 14, 15), producer (tracks 13–15)
Eric Caudieux – keyboard (tracks 3, 7, 9, 12), programming, orchestration, editing
Eric Valentine – keyboard (track 14), drums (tracks 13, 14), percussion (tracks 13, 14), bass (track 14), engineering (tracks 13, 14), mixing (track 14), production (tracks 13, 14)
Jeff Campitelli – drums (tracks 1–12), percussion (tracks 1, 4, 6, 8–12), clapping (track 7)
Elk Thunder – percussion (track 8)
Rhoades Howe – percussion (track 14), engineering assistance (tracks 13, 14)
Stuart Hamm – bass (tracks 1, 3–12)
Mike Manning – clapping (track 7)
Mike Fraser – clapping (track 7), engineering (tracks 1–13), mixing (tracks 1–13), production (tracks 1–13)
John Cuniberti – engineering (tracks 14, 15), mixing (tracks 15), production (tracks 14, 15)
Kent Matcke – engineering assistance (tracks 1–10, 12)
Kevin Scott – engineering assistance (tracks 1–12), mixing assistance (track 14)
Stephen Hart – engineering assistance (track 15)
Judy Kirschner – engineering assistance
Zac Allentuck – mixing assistance (tracks 1–10, 12, 13)
George Marino – mastering

Chart performance

Album

Certifications

Awards

References

External links
Crystal Planet at satriani.com
Joe Satriani "Crystal Planet" album review at Guitar Nine

Joe Satriani albums
1998 albums
Epic Records albums
Albums produced by Mike Fraser
Grammy Award for Best Rock Instrumental Performance